The 1925 Tuskegee Golden Tigers football team was an American football team that represented Tuskegee University as a member of the Southern Intercollegiate Athletic Conference (SIAC) during the 1925 college football season. In its third season under head coach Cleveland Abbott, Tuskegee compiled an 8–0–1 record, won the SIAC championship, shut out eight of nine opponents, and outscored all opponents by a total of 244 to 6. The team was recognized as the black college national champion. The team played its home games at the Alumni Bowl in Tuskegee, Alabama.

Schedule

References

Tuskegee
Tuskegee Golden Tigers football seasons
Black college football national champions
Tuskegee Golden Tigers football
College football undefeated seasons